Steven Pasquale (pronounced ; born November 18, 1976) is an American actor. He is best known for his role as the New York City Firefighter/Emergency Medical Technician Sean Garrity in the series Rescue Me. He made his television debut on the HBO series Six Feet Under, playing a love interest for David. He has also starred in the film Aliens vs. Predator: Requiem, and as Scott in American Son, on both stage and screen.

Life and career
Pasquale was born in Hershey, Pennsylvania. He attended Bishop McDevitt High School, a Roman Catholic school in Harrisburg, PA. He attended the Meadows School of the Arts at Southern Methodist University as a theatre major for one semester before moving to New York, where he starred in numerous theatre productions. He originated the role of Fabrizio in the Seattle cast of The Light in the Piazza. However, scheduling conflicts with Rescue Me prevented him from reprising the role on Broadway, a disappointment he described as "the most heartbreaking thing that I've ever experienced professionally."

He played the role of Sheriff Joe Sutter in the musical The Spitfire Grill, where he introduced the song "Forest For the Trees." He then landed the lead role of Chris in the 1998 American tour of Miss Saigon. In 2002, he played Robbie Faye in the New York production of A Man of No Importance and Archibald Craven at the Joey DiPaolo AIDS Foundation's concert of The Secret Garden alongside Michael Arden, Jaclyn Nedenthal, Will Chase, Max von Essen, Celia Keenan-Bolger, and Tony Award-winning actress Laura Benanti, whom he later married.

In April 2009, the record label PS Classics released Pasquale's first album, Somethin' Like Love, a jazz record produced by Jessica Molaskey and John Pizzarelli.  He launched his official website in February 2009 and starred in the Broadway play Reasons to Be Pretty by Neil LaBute.  

In 2011, Pasquale played the lead role of Paul Keller on the Fox Television Studios pilot Over/Under. The pilot was rejected in 2012 but aired on the USA Network on January 4, 2013. He also starred  in the U.S. miniseries Coma.

He was the lead actor for the NBC series Do No Harm, which premiered on January 31, 2013, to the lowest debut rating in the history of prime-time television.

In 2013, Pasquale starred in The Bridges of Madison County at the Williamstown Theatre Festival, alongside Kelli O'Hara. He also starred in the Broadway production of the musical at the Gerald Schoenfeld Theatre beginning in late January 2014, with Kelli O'Hara replacing Elena Shaddow. He had previously worked with O'Hara in 2013, in the world premiere of Richard Greenberg and Scott Frankel's musical Far from Heaven, in which he portrayed Frank Whitaker.

In 2014, Pasquale guest starred in Season 6, episode 4 of the CBS legal drama series The Good Wife. He portrayed Jonathan Elfman, campaign manager for Alicia Florrick, who was played by Julianna Margulies.

He starred alongside Laura Osnes in Lyric Opera of Chicago's musical Carousel, which closed May 3, 2015.

In 2016, he portrayed Mark Fuhrman in the FX limited series American Crime Story: The People v. O.J. Simpson.  He received the 2016 Lucille Lortel Award for Outstanding Lead Actor in a Musical for portraying Jamie Lockhart in the 2016 revival of The Robber Bridegroom at the Roundabout Theater Company.

Personal life
Pasquale has a daughter with his high-school sweetheart, who was born when Pasquale was twenty years old. He and Maddie's mother never married.

Pasquale was married to actress and singer Laura Benanti from 2007 to 2013. In February 2016, he became engaged to actress and singer Phillipa Soo. They married on September 24, 2017. They practice Transcendental Meditation.

Credits

Theater

Film

Television

References

External links
 
 
 

1976 births
20th-century American male actors
21st-century American male actors
American male film actors
American male stage actors
American male television actors
American tenors
Living people
Male actors from Pennsylvania
People from Hershey, Pennsylvania
21st-century American singers
21st-century American male singers
American people of Italian descent